was a town located in Santō District, Niigata Prefecture, Japan.

On April 1, 2005, Mishima, along with the town of Oguni (from Kariwa District), the village of Yamakoshi (from Koshi District), the town of Nakanoshima (from Minamikanbara District), and the town of Koshiji (also from Santō District), was merged into the expanded city of Nagaoka.

Transportation

Railway
 had been operated in the town until 1975.

Highway
 
 

Dissolved municipalities of Niigata Prefecture
Nagaoka, Niigata